Geovane Nascimento Silva (born 15 June 1998), simply known as Geovane, is a Brazilian footballer who plays as a midfielder for Inter de Limeira.

Career statistics

References

External links

1998 births
Living people
Sportspeople from Bahia
Brazilian footballers
Association football midfielders
Campeonato Brasileiro Série A players
Campeonato Brasileiro Série B players
São Paulo FC players
América Futebol Clube (MG) players
Associação Atlética Internacional (Limeira) players
Campeonato de Portugal (league) players
Louletano D.C. players
Brazil youth international footballers
Brazilian expatriate footballers
Brazilian expatriate sportspeople in Portugal
Expatriate footballers in Portugal